Robert Hjalmar Nobel (4 August 1829 – 7 August 1896) was a Swedish businessman, industrialist and  investor. He was the founder of Branobel, and a pioneer in the Russian oil industry.

Biography
Robert Nobel was born in Maria Magdalena parish in Stockholm, Sweden,  the eldest son of Karolina Andrietta Ahlsell and her husband Immanuel Nobel. He was the brother of Emil Oscar Nobel, Ludvig Nobel and Alfred Nobel.

Robert  Nobel started Branobel, an important early oil company which controlled a significant amount of Russian oil output.
In 1873 he started his business in Baku, Azerbaijan and began to interest his brother Ludvig in the growing company. 
In 1876, he bought an interest in an oil refinery in  Baku.
In 1878, together with the third brother Alfred Nobel, the two brothers formed Naftabolaget Bröderna Nobel  (Branobel).

In 1880, Ludvig took over the business because Robert's health was failing. Robert returned to Sweden to seek a cure.
He applied to several seaside resorts in southern Europe before settling at Getå  in Norrköping Municipality  during 1888. He died during 1896 and was buried at Norra begravningsplatsen in Stockholm.

See also
Nobel family

References

Other sources

External links
 

1829 births
1896 deaths
Businesspeople from Stockholm
Robert
Businesspeople from the Russian Empire
19th-century Swedish businesspeople
People in the petroleum industry
Founders of the petroleum industry

Burials at Norra begravningsplatsen